Dunham Wright (March 13, 1842 – December 5, 1942) was an American politician and pioneer settler in the state of Oregon. He was a cousin of Abraham Lincoln and homesteaded in the area presently known as Medical Springs, Oregon. He served in the Oregon House of Representatives in 1872.

References

1842 births
1942 deaths
Members of the Oregon House of Representatives
Place of birth missing
People from Union County, Oregon